Richard Henderson (or variants) may refer to:

Richard Henderson (jurist) (1734–1785), Colonial American judge and land speculator
Richard McNeil Henderson, (1886 - 1972) British engineer and colonial HK administrator
Richard Alexander Henderson (1895–1958), First World War stretcher-bearer at Gallipoli and the Somme
Dickie Henderson (1922–1985), English music hall, theatre, film and television entertainer
Rick Henderson (1928–2004), American jazz saxophonist, composer and arranger
Richard Henderson (biologist) (born 1945), Scottish molecular biologist
Richard Henderson (solicitor) (born 1947), Scottish solicitor
Richard Henderson (bishop) (born 1957), Irish Anglican bishop
Rickey Henderson (born 1958), American baseball player
Richard Henderson (politician) (born 1971), member of the Kentucky House of Representatives

See also
Henderson (surname)